The presidents of the British Society for the History of Medicine have been:

1965-1975

1975-1985

1985-1995

1995-2005

2005-2015

2015-2019

See also
British Society for the History of Medicine
List of presidents of the Scottish Society of the History of Medicine
Poynter Lecture

References 

Lists of presidents of organizations